William Bainbridge (1774–1833) was a commodore in the U.S. Navy.

William Bainbridge may also refer to:

Bill Bainbridge (1922–1966), English footballer
William G. Bainbridge (1925–2008), U.S. Army officer
William Sims Bainbridge (born 1940), American sociologist
William Seaman Bainbridge (1870–1947), American surgeon and gynecologist
William Bainbridge (MP) (died 1583), MP for Derby

See also
William Bainbridge Castle (1814–1872), American politician, mayor of Cleveland, Ohio
William Bambridge (1820–1879), missionary in Waimate, New Zealand and photographer to Queen Victoria
USS Bainbridge, several ships named after the US commodore